Plantão da Globo is the title of the breaking news segment of TV Globo that, normally, interrupts the programming of the broadcaster to report last-minute news, that have some importance to society. In accordance with the original format, it is produced and presented by journalists that are on duty in the broadcaster and that are called for that.

The title sequence consists on a 3D animation of several news microphones and cameras orbiting around and then flying towards the screen, with the Plantão theme music playing along.

Due to the relatively rare occurrence of this format (normally seen only a few times a year), the alarming music, and the wide cultural association of Plantão breaking news title with shocking events or disasters, it is largely feared by Brazilian spectators.

Exhibition 
The current format, with characteristic music and title sequence, was first transmitted in August 19 1991, bringing news that the United States had ceased all economic aid to the USSR. Currently, the Plantão has technical collaboration from Globo News, mainly during dawn and in weekends. Currently, the program is exhibited simultaneously in both channels at once, under the supervision of the Globo Journalism Directorate.
The program is transmitted live across Brazil, even in states with different timezones to Brasilia Time that transmit the normal programming in a shifted time. Because of this, there has been occurrences where the bulletin has interrupted a time-shifted newscast, in which the presenter of said newscast is the presenter of the Plantão.

Impact 
It's the oldest and most famous known extra (journalistic language) in Brazil, having reported almost all major news events of the last 30 years, such as wars, deaths, natural disasters, accidents, sequesters, historical occurrences, terrorist attacks, political events, across the world. Along with the audio - inspired in the title sequence of Repórter Esso, from Rede Tupi, composed by then maestro of TV Globo, João Nabuco, the title sequence and outro, created by Hans Donner, is iconic and known characteristic of the newscast, that has a certain influence over journalism and national behavior. Normally, everything that is shown in the Plantão is shown on other newscasts. Images made live in Brazil have already been retransmitted by big international news channels, such as CNN's Breaking News during the kidnapping of bus 174 in Rio de Janeiro and in the TAM 3054 accident in São Paulo. Among all of the facts broadcast to this day, the most remembered is the September 11 attacks, both by the impact of the news, as well as for the "mystery" of which program was interrupted that day by the newscast, with many urban legends saying the program interrupted was an episode of Dragon Ball Z (though there is a lack of evidence for this, suggesting it's a case of the Mandela Effect).

With the advent of social media, the Plantão da Globo has become the most talked about subject from the moment it's put on air, be it by the impact of the information that interrupts normal broadcasting or by the reaction of the title sequence when it does interrupt.

The largest number of times the show was broadcast on a single day was on May 1, 1994, as a result of the death of Formula 1 driver Ayrton Senna. The years with the least quantity of broadcasts were 2014, in which only two broadcasts happened in the year - one in February and one in September - and 2019, another year where only two broadcasts happened: the first in January 13, with the extradition of Italian terrorist Cesare Battisti, that happened in Bolivia, and the second in May 12, when the death of actor Lúcio Mauro was announced. Both were shown in the early morning of a Sunday. This is because of the new directive of global journalism that resumed the extra bulletins of the normal newscasts from the broadcaster, almost extinguishing the occurrences of the show.

The broadcast with the most live viewers was during May 18, 2017, reporting the accusations of then president Michel Temer and of federal deputy Aécio Neves, surpassing the broadcast reporting the impeachment of Dilma Rousseff.

References 

Portuguese-language television shows
1982 Brazilian television series debuts